For the swimming competitions at the 2012 Summer Olympics the following qualification systems were in place.  The list has been updated to 20 August 2011.  Qualification ends on 3 July 2012.

Qualifying standards 

A National Olympic Committee (NOC) may enter up to 2 qualified athletes in each individual event if both meet the Olympic Qualifying Time (OQT). 1 athlete per event can potentially qualify should they meet the Olympic Selection Time (OST) and if the quota of 900 athletes has not been met. NOCs may enter swimmers regardless of time (1 swimmer per sex) if they have no swimmers meeting either standard entry time.

The qualifying time standards must be obtained in Continental Championships, National Olympic Trials or International Competitions approved by FINA in the period 1 March 2011 to 3 July 2012.

FINA qualifying standards are as follows:

Individual events 

Only those with the Olympic Qualifying Time (OQT) are listed below as on the FINA website as those with the Olympic Selection Time are not guaranteed a place in the Olympic Games. Named swimmers have qualified personally through national selection meets or have been nominated by their National Olympic Committee (NOC).

The result is here:
 438 – OQT (59 NF/NOCs)
 181 – OST (12 NF/NOCs) – some still to be confirmed
 131 – Relay-only swimmers
 150 – Universality (95 NF/NOCs)
 Total: 900 (166 NF/NOCs)

Men's individual events

Men's 50 m freestyle

Men's 100 m freestyle

Men's 200 m freestyle

Men's 400 m freestyle

Men's 1500 m freestyle

Men's 100 m backstroke 

* Chris Walker-Hebborn qualified in this event by an allocated quota, following a sudden withdrawal of Israel's Jonatan Kopelev.

Men's 200 m backstroke

Men's 100 m breaststroke

Men's 200 m breaststroke

Men's 100 m butterfly

Men's 200 m butterfly

Men's 200 m individual medley

Men's 400 m individual medley 

* to be confirmed by NF/NOC

Women's individual events

Women's 50 m freestyle

Women's 100 m freestyle

Women's 200 m freestyle

Women's 400 m freestyle

Women's 800 m freestyle

Women's 100 m backstroke

Women's 200 m backstroke

Women's 100 m breaststroke

Women's 200 m breaststroke

Women's 100 m butterfly

Women's 200 m butterfly

Women's 200 m individual medley

Women's 400 m individual medley 

* to be confirmed by NF/NOC

Relay events

Men's relay events

Men's 4 × 100 m freestyle relay

Men's 4 × 200 m freestyle relay

Men's 4 × 100 m medley relay

Women's relay events

Women's 4 × 100 m freestyle relay

Women's 4 × 200 m freestyle relay

Women's 4 × 100 m medley relay

Open water events

Men's 10 km marathon

Women's 10 km marathon 

 * If not qualified by any means.  If Great Britain has already qualified quota will be added to the 2012 Olympic Marathon Swim Qualifier.

Notes

References

 
2012